Thomasia solanacea is a species of flowering plant in the family Malvaceae and is endemic to the south-west of Western Australia. It is an erect, bushy shrub with egg-shaped leaves, the bases heart-shaped, and racemes of white, cream-coloured or pink to purple flowers.

Description
The leaves have irregular edges and are covered with star-shaped hairs. Flowering occurs from September to December.

Taxonomy and naming
This species was first formally described in 1812 by Sims who gave it the name Lasiopetalum solaceum in the Botanical Magazine. In 1821, Jaques Étienne Gay transferred the species to the genus Thomasia in the journal Mémoires du Muséum d'Histoire Naturelle. The specific epithet (solanacea) means "Solanum-like".

Distribution and habitat
Thomasia solanacea usually grows as an undershrub in woodland and occurs between Denmark, the Stirling Range and Mount Manypeaks in the Esperance Plains, Jarrah Forest and Warren bioregions of south-western Western Australia.

Conservation status
Thomasia solanacea is listed as "Priority Four" by the Government of Western Australia Department of Biodiversity, Conservation and Attractions, meaning that it is rare or near threatened.

References

Rosids of Western Australia
solanacea
Plants described in 1812
Taxa named by John Sims (taxonomist)